Liga Perdana 1 or Liga Perdana Satu was the nation's top-tier professional football league in Malaysia that operated from 1998 to 2003.

The league was formed and established in 1998 to succeed the Liga Perdana (1994–97) after FAM decision to allows clubs other than state FAs to compete in the professional level league in Malaysia. It was then succeeded in 2004 by the formation of Liga Super by Football Association of Malaysia (FAM). The first game was played on 4 April 1998.

The last champions of Liga Perdana 1 is Perak which won the league for second straight season. Since the league inception, four teams has been the champion of Liga Perdana 1 where Perak, Pulau Pinang (2), Pahang and Selangor each wins one time.

History

Founding 
A football league competition involving the representative sides of the state football associations was first held in Malaysia in 1979. When it began, it was intended primarily as a qualifying tournament for the final knock-out stages of the Malaysia Cup. It was not  until 1982 that a League Cup was introduced to recognise the winners of the preliminary stage as the league champions. Over the years, the league competition has gained important stature in its own right.

Initially the only teams allowed to participate in the Liga Perdana were the state FA's sides, teams representing the Armed Forces and the Police, and teams representing the neighbouring countries of Singapore and Brunei (though the Football Association of Singapore pulled out of the Malaysian League after the 1994 season following a dispute with the Football Association of Malaysia over gate receipts, and has not been involved since).

Only in 1997 where promotion from Malaysia FAM Cup to the professional Malaysian League was introduced for the first time. Johor FC and NS Chempaka FC were the first two sides to be promoted that year to Liga Perdana 2 for 1998 season.

In 1998, Liga Perdana was divided into two divisions consist of Liga Perdana 1 and Liga Perdana 2. During this time both of the division was still just referred as Malaysian League as a whole.

During 1998, Liga Perdana 1 consisted of 12 teams while Liga Perdana 2 had 8 teams. 10 teams that previously qualified for Malaysia Cup which played in 1997 Liga Perdana were automatically qualified to Liga Perdana 1. The other two spots were filled by a playoff round of the 5 lowest teams in 1997 Liga Perdana and the Malaysian Olympic football team. The lowest four teams from playoff round were then put into Liga Perdana 2 alongside Police, Malaysia Military, Negeri Sembilan Chempaka F.C and PKN Johor. At this time the league still consisted of semi-pro team where each team was allowed to register 25 players where 12 players must be a professional for Liga Perdana 1 and a minimum of six professional players in Liga Perdana 2.

Both leagues continued until 2003 when Football Association of Malaysia (FAM) decided to privatise the league for 2004 season onwards where Liga Super was formed. Teams in Liga Perdana 1 and Liga Perdana 2 was then was put through a qualification and playoff to be promoted into Liga Super. Teams that failed the qualification was put into the new second-tier league, the Liga Premier.

Teams 
In its inaugural season 12 teams competing in the league. The teams were based from 10 best performing teams from 1997 Liga Perdana season. Penang and Olympic 2000 joins the league to complete the 12 teams list after winning the qualifying tournament.

Teams competing in 1998 season 
12 teams competing in the first season of Liga Perdana 1.

  Penang
  Pahang
  Brunei
  Kedah
  Sabah
  Sarawak
  Perak
  Kuala Lumpur
  Negeri Sembilan
  Selangor
  Perlis
  Olympic 2000

League Table:-

1.Penang  - 41 PTS (1998 Liga Perdana 1 Champions)

2.Pahang  - 40 PTS 

3.Brunei  - 35 PTS

4.Kedah  - 34 PTS

5.Sabah  - 31 PTS

6.Sarawak  - 30 PTS

7.Perak  - 29 PTS

8.Kuala Lumpur  - 29 PTS

9.Negeri Sembilan  - 27 PTS

10.Selangor  - 25 PTS (Relegated to Liga Perdana 2)

11.Perlis  - 25 PTS (Relegated to Liga Perdana 2)

12.Olympic 2000  - 18 PTS (Relegated to Liga Perdana 2)

Teams competing in 1999 season 
10 teams competing in the second season of Liga Perdana 1. Terengganu was promoted while Selangor, Perlis and Olympic 2000 were relegated to Liga Perdana 2.

  Pahang
  Penang
  Negeri Sembilan
  Sabah
  Kuala Lumpur
  Sarawak
  Brunei
  Terengganu
  Perak
  Kedah

League Table:-

1.Pahang  - 34 PTS (1999 Liga Perdana 1 Champions)

2.Penang  - 31 PTS 

3.Negeri Sembilan  - 29 PTS

4.Sabah  - 29 PTS

5.Kuala Lumpur  - 28 PTS

6.Sarawak  - 27 PTS

7.Brunei  - 25 PTS

8.Terengganu  - 23 PTS

9.Perak  - 23 PTS

10.Kedah  - 21 PTS  (Relegated to Liga Perdana 2)

Teams competing in 2000 season 
12 teams competing in the third season of Liga Perdana 1. Perlis and Johor were promoted while Kedah was relegated to Liga Perdana 2.

  Selangor
  Penang
  Perak
  Terengganu
  Sarawak
  Negeri Sembilan
  Pahang
  Kuala Lumpur
  Perlis
  Johor
  Sabah
  Brunei

League Table:-

1.Selangor  - 45 PTS (2000 Liga Perdana 1 Champions)

2.Penang  - 43 PTS

3.Perak  - 41 PTS

4.Terengganu  - 35 PTS

5.Sarawak  - 35 PTS

6.Negeri Sembilan  - 33 PTS

7.Pahang  - 31 PTS

8.Kuala Lumpur  - 29 PTS

9.Perlis  - 25 PTS

10.Johor  - 20 PTS

11.Sabah  - 16 PTS  (Relegated to Liga Perdana 2)

12.Brunei  - 11 PTS  (Relegated to Liga Perdana 2)

Teams competing in 2001 season 
12 teams competing in the fourth season of Liga Perdana 1. Malacca and Kelantan were promoted while Sabah and Brunei were relegated to Liga Perdana 2.

  Penang
  Terengganu
  Kelantan
  Selangor
  Pahang
  Perlis
  Perak
  Negeri Sembilan
  Sarawak
  Kuala Lumpur
  Malacca
  Johor

League Table:-

1.Penang  - 50 PTS (2001 Liga Perdana 1 Champions)

2.Terengganu  - 41 PTS

3.Kelantan  - 38 PTS

4.Selangor  - 34 PTS

5.Pahang  - 32 PTS

6.Perlis  - 31 PTS

7.Perak  - 29 PTS

8.Negeri Sembilan  - 27 PTS

9.Sarawak  - 24 PTS

10.Kuala Lumpur  - 23 PTS

11.Malacca  - 22 PTS

12.Johor  - 10 PTS  (Relegated to Liga Perdana 2)

Teams competing in 2002 season 
14 teams competing in the fifth season of Liga Perdana 1. Johor FC, Sabah and NS Chempaka were promoted while Johor was relegated to Liga Perdana 2.

  Perak
  Selangor
  Sabah
  Penang
  Terengganu
  Johor FC
  Perlis
  Sarawak
  Pahang
  Kelantan
  Malacca
  NS Chempaka
  Kuala Lumpur
  Negeri Sembilan

League Table:-

1.Perak  - 60 PTS (2002 Liga Perdana 1 Champions)

2.Selangor  - 56 PTS

3.Sabah  - 47 PTS

4.Penang  - 47 PTS

5.Terengganu  - 41 PTS

6.Johor FC  - 41 PTS

7.Perlis  - 41 PTS

8.Sarawak  - 34 PTS

9.Pahang  - 31 PTS

10.Kelantan  - 30 PTS

11.Malacca  - 27 PTS

12.NS Chempaka  - 19 PTS

13.Kuala Lumpur  - 16 PTS  (Relegated to Liga Perdana 2)

14.Negeri Sembilan  - 16 PTS  (Relegated to Liga Perdana 2)

Teams competing in 2003 season 
13 teams competing in the six season of Liga Perdana 1 after NS Chempaka pulled out from the league. Kedah and TMFC were promoted while Kuala Lumpur and Negeri Sembilan were relegated to Liga Perdana 2.

  Perak
  Kedah
  Perlis
  Sabah
  Pahang
  Penang
  Johor FC
  Sarawak
  TMFC
  Kelantan
  Malacca
  Selangor
  Terengganu

League Table:-

1.Perak  - 47 PTS (2003 Liga Perdana 1 Champions)

2.Kedah  - 45 PTS

3.Perlis  - 45 PTS

4.Sabah  - 38 PTS

5.Pahang  - 36 PTS

6.Penang  - 36 PTS

7.Johor FC  - 34 PTS  (Relegation Play-Off) (Relegated to Liga Premier)

8.Sarawak  - 34 PTS  (Relegation Play-Off) (Stay in the league)

9.TMFC  - 32 PTS  (Relegation Play-Off) (Relegated to Liga Premier)

10.Kelantan  - 28 PTS  (Relegation Play-Off) (Relegated to Liga Premier)

11.Malacca  - 20 PTS  (Relegated to Liga Premier)

12.Selangor  - 18 PTS  (Relegated to Liga Premier)

13.Terengganu  - 13 PTS  (Relegated to Liga Premier)

Champions 
Below is the list of champions of Liga Perdana from 1998 until 2003.

References 

 
1
Defunct top level football leagues in Asia
Sports leagues established in 1998